Legnano is a railway station in Italy. Located on the common section of the Domodossola–Milan, Luino–Milan and Porto Ceresio–Milan lines, it serves the town of Legnano.

Services
Legnano is served by line S5 of the Milan suburban railway network, and by the Milan–Varese regional line, both operated by the Lombard railway company Trenord.

See also
 Milan suburban railway network

References

External links

Railway stations in Lombardy
Milan S Lines stations
Railway stations opened in 1860
Legnano